The Lords of Verona ruled the city from 1260 until 19 October 1387 and for ten days in 1404. The lordship was created when Mastino I della Scala was raised to the rank of capitano del popolo from that of podestà. His descendants, the Scaliger, all Ghibellines, ruled the city and its vicinity as a hereditary seigniory for a century and a half, during which the city experienced its golden age.

See also
 Timeline of Verona

 
Verona, Lords of
Scaliger family